Andrey Valerievich Fedyaev (Russian Cyrillic: Андрей Валерьевич Федяев; born February 26, 1981) is a Russian cosmonaut.

Biography
Fedyaev received an engineering degree in air transport and Air Traffic Control from the Balashov Military Aviation School in 2004.  Following graduation, Fedyaev joined the Russian Air Force in the 317th mixed aviation segment.  He obtained the rank of major before his retirement in 2013.  He logged over 500 hours in Russian aircraft.

Fedyaev was selected as a cosmonaut in 2012.  He reported to the Gagarin Cosmonaut Training Center in 2012 and was named a test cosmonaut on June 16, 2014.

On July 15, 2022, he was assigned to the SpaceX Crew-6 mission after a recent crew swap agreement between NASA and Roscosmos. This mission has a February 2023 launch schedule. He was one of the mission specialists, along with the Emirati astronaut Sultan Al Neyadi.

References

External links
 Astronaut.ru biography
 Roscosmos biography
 Spacefacts biography

Living people
People from Serov
Russian cosmonauts
1981 births